Baard Madsen Haugland (12 January 1835 – 7 May 1896) was a Norwegian merchant and politician with the Liberal Party.

Biography
He was born at the Haugland farm at Stord (Haugland på Stord) in Hordaland, Norway. Haugland was a merchant by profession
and worked in the trade business in Bergen from 1851 until 1884.  

Haugland was  mayor (ordførar)  of Stord from 1864. In 1870, he entered the Norwegian Parliament as a representative of Søndre Bergenhus amt (now Hordaland). He was Minister of Finance 1884-1888 and member of the Council of State Division in Stockholm 1888-1889 and 1895-1896 under Prime Minister Johan Sverdrup.

Haugland was made a member of the Order of St. Olav  in 1886 and received the Commander's Cross  1st class in 1895.
He was also made a commander of the Order of the Polar Star. He died in Stockholm during the spring of 1896 and was buried at Vår Frelsers  gravlund in Oslo.

References

1835 births
1896 deaths
People from Hordaland
Government ministers of Norway
Ministers of Finance of Norway
Norwegian businesspeople
 Recipients of the St. Olav's Medal
Commanders of the Order of the Polar Star
Burials at the Cemetery of Our Saviour